Dichagyris rubidior is a moth of the family Noctuidae. It is endemic to the mountains of Lebanon and the upper part of Mount Hermon in the Golan Heights.

Adults are on wing from June to August. There is one generation per year.

External links
 Noctuinae of Israel

rubidior
Moths of the Middle East
Moths described in 1933